Manuel González Salmón (20 October 1778, in Cádiz – 18 January 1832, in Madrid), was a Spanish politician and diplomat who served twice as Prime Minister of Spain.

Biography
He was First Secretary at the Spanish Embassy in Paris from 1814 to 1819, when he became Acting Prime Minister of Spain between 12 June and 12 September 1819. After this he became Ambassador to Saxony and later Russia until 1826, when he became Prime Minister for the second time.

Despite the fact that he remained Prime Minister for 6 years, a very long term in Spanish politics, very little was known of his actions during that period. This was because he was dominated by Francisco Calomarde and Luis López Ballesteros, the real leaders of the Cabinet.

He died in January 1832 while still in office.

Sources

Prime Ministers of Spain
Foreign ministers of Spain
1778 births
1832 deaths
19th-century Spanish politicians